Lippo is an Italian historical male name and it represents a diminutive of Filippo (usually Pippo in Italy nowadays). It may refer to:

 Lippo I Alidosi (14th century), Lord of Imola
 Lippo II Alidosi (died 1350), Lord of Imola
 Lippo Hertzka (1904–1951), Hungarian footballer
 Lippo Lippi (1406–1469), Italian painter
 Lippo Memmi (c. 1291–1356), Italian painter
 Lippo Vanni (14th century), Italian painter

Masculine given names